Population may refer to:
Population, a summation of all the organisms of the same group or species, who live in the same geographical area.
Statistical population, which is a set of similar items or events which is of interest for some question or experiment.
Population genetics, the study of the distributions and changes of allele frequency in a population.
Metallicity, star populations.

Human population
Population density
List of sovereign states and dependent territories by population density
List of city districts by population density
World Population
World population estimates
World population milestones
Projections of population growth
List of continents by population
List of countries by population
List of countries by population growth rate
List of countries by population in 1900
List of countries by population in 2000
List of countries by population in 2010
List of countries by population (United Nations)
List of countries by past and future population
List of countries by foreign-born population
List of African countries by population
List of Asian countries by population
List of European countries by population
List of North American countries by population
List of Oceanian countries by population
List of South American countries by population
List of urban areas by population
List of cities proper by population
List of national capitals by population
List of sovereign states and dependent territories by birth rate
Demography, the statistical study of human populations
Demographics, the quantifiable statistics of a given population
Human overpopulation
Overconsumption
Population growth
Zero population growth, a condition in which a population neither grows nor declines
Center of population, a geographical point that describes a centerpoint of the region's population
Human population planning, the practice of artificially altering the rate of growth of a human population
Population momentum, population growth at the national level if levels of childbearing declined to replacement level
Population reconstruction a method used by historical demographers analysing patterns of family formation, fertility, mortality, and migration, and of consequent trends such as population growth.
Population pyramid, a graphical illustration showing the distribution of various age groups in a population
Population ethics, the philosophical study of the ethical problems concerning populations
List of religious populations
Christian population growth, the growth of population of the global Christian community
Muslim population growth, the growth of population of the global Muslim community

Organisations

Population Matters, a think tank, and campaign group concerned with the impact of population growth on long term sustainability
Population Connection, organization attempting to stop what they believe is an unsustainable rate of world population growth
Population Council, a non-governmental organization conducting biomedical, social science, and public health research
Population Reference Bureau, nonprofit organization providing information about population, health and the environment for research or academic purposes
Population Europe, a collaborative network of Europe’s demographic research institutes and centres
Population Action International, NGO aiming to improve global access to family planning and reproductive health care
Negative Population Growth, a membership organization advocating a gradual reduction in U.S. and world population
Minnesota Population Center, interdisciplinary research center at the University of Minnesota
Office of Population Research, the oldest population research center in the United States
Population Association of America, a non-profit scientific professional association dedicated to the study of issues related to population and demography
Max Planck Institute for Demographic Research, the largest demographic research body in Europe
North Atlantic Population Project, a collaboration of historical demographers in Britain, Canada, Denmark, Germany, Iceland, Norway, and Sweden

Events

World Population Day, an annual event, observed on July 11 every year
World Population Conferences
World Population Conference, event held in Geneva, Switzerland in 1927

Publications 
An Essay on the Principle of Population, 1798 and "acknowledged as the most influential work of its era"
Population & Environment, journal on bi-directional links between population, natural resources, and the natural environment
Population and Development Review, a quarterly peer-reviewed academic journal published on behalf of the Population Council
Population and housing censuses by country
The Population Bomb

Population of other organisms
Lists of organisms by population
Lists of mammals by population

Other
Population dynamics
Population size, the number of individual organisms in a population
Population decline, the decline in population of any organism
Population bottleneck a sharp reduction in the size of a population due to environmental events
Population cycle, a phenomenon where populations rise and fall over a predictable period of time
Population biology, the biological study of animal populations
Population ecology, the dynamics of species populations and how these populations interact with the environment
Statistical population
Stellar population (astronomy)

Media

Population: 1, a 1986 punk rock musical film
Population Override, the twelfth studio album by Buckethead
Population Me, an album by Dwight Yoakam
Population (album), an album by The Most Serene Republic
Population Control, the fourth studio album by East Coast hip hop producer Statik Selektah
Save the Population, a Red Hot Chili Peppers ' promotional single from their 2003 Greatest Hits album
Population: 2, a 2012 American film directed by Gil Luna

See also
People (disambiguation)

Population